"(Lay Your Head on My) Pillow" is a song by American R&B group Tony! Toni! Toné!. It was released by Mercury and Polygram Records on January 11, 1994, as the third single from their 1993 album Sons of Soul. The midtempo love ballad was written and produced by the group and recorded at Paradise Recording Studio in Sacramento, California.

"(Lay Your Head on My) Pillow" charted at number 31 on the Billboard Hot 100 and at number four on the Hot R&B Singles. It was promoted with a music video wherein the group appeared nude; they conceived it as their response to criticism of male artists for sexually objectifying women in music videos

Music and lyrics 

Tony! Toni! Toné! recorded the song for their third album Sons of Soul, which was recorded and released in 1993. The song was produced and written by the group—drummer Timothy Christian Riley, guitarist D'wayne Wiggins, and bassist Raphael Wiggins.

A midtempo love ballad, "(Lay Your Head on My) Pillow" features tender, seductive lyrics. The group incorporated country-influenced pedal steel guitar in the song after a country band had used it at Paradise Recording Studio, where they recorded the song. Gil Griffin of The Washington Post writes that the song is informed by "the sensual moods of Barry White and Isaac Hayes".

Music video 
A music video for the song was released in February 1994. It featured the group members, along with several supporting actors, appearing nude. Members of the video crew were reported to have "giggled a lot" during the 14-hour shoot. It was reshot after BET, MTV, and other cable outlets requested them to minimize the nudity for airplay. D'wayne Wiggins explained the concept as their response to criticism of male artists for sexually objectifying women in music videos, calling their video "sort of a role-reversal thing". He said in an interview for The Atlanta Journal-Constitution that he received the most "giggles ... because I went first, which I had to do because I was the one leading everybody on to do it nude. It's not like it's nudity just for nudity's sake, but we didn't want to do another la-de-da video. It's like 14 or 15 people are together in a room and different people are shown without clothes at different times."

Personnel 
Credits are adapted from the single's 7-inch pressing (Wing #858260-7).

 Gerry Brown – mixing
 Ed Eckstine – executive producer
 Timothy Christian Riley – composer, drummer 
 Tony! Toni! Toné! – producer
 D'wayne Wiggins – composer, guitarist
 Raphael Wiggins – bassist, composer

Charts

Weekly charts

Year-end charts

References 

1994 singles
Songs written by Raphael Saadiq
Tony! Toni! Toné! songs
1993 songs
Songs written by D'wayne Wiggins
Mercury Records singles
Contemporary R&B ballads
1990s ballads